Two ships of the Royal Navy have been named HMS Pasley, after Admiral Sir Thomas Pasley. A third was planned, but renamed before entering service.

  was an  launched in 1916 and sold in 1921.
 HMS Pasley was to have been a frigate. She was returned to the US Navy in 1946.
  was a  launched in 1943. She was transferred to the Royal Navy under lend-lease, and was returned to the US Navy in 1945.

See also: HM 

Royal Navy ship names